Life’s a Glitch with Julien Bam is a Netflix series starring Julien Bam and Joon Kim. The first season with 4 episodes was released on October 21, 2021, directed by Shawn Bu.

Story 
Julien Bam is a successful influencer who just won the "Personality of the Year" award. A car accident with his friend Joon Kim throws them to another dimension where Joon is a gangster rapper and Julien is a taxi driver. With the help of a quantum physicist, they must find their way back home.

Cast 
 Julien Bam: Julien
 Joon Kim: Joon
 Safira Robens: Lia
 Andreas Dyszewski: Olek
 Juri Padel: Dima
 Leon Seidel: Max
 Vivien König: Clara
 Madieu Ulbrich: Diego
 Rebecca Soraya Zaman: Hana
 Luciana Caglioti: nurse
 Daniela Lebang: nurse

Episodes 
Life's a Glitch is a TV Mini Series. The first season consisted of four episodes and was released on Netflix in its entirety on October 21, 2021.

Production 
The first season was shot between October 9, 2020 and April 16, 2021.

External links 
 
 Netflix

References 

2021 German television series debuts
2020s science fiction television series
2020s German comedy television series
Television shows set in Europe
German-language Netflix original programming
Television series about social media

de:Life’s a Glitch